Paracymoriza bleszynskialis is a moth in the family Crambidae. It was described by Rolf-Ulrich Roesler and Wolfgang Speidel in 1981. It is found in China (Sichuan, Zhejiang, Hubei, Hunan, Guizhou).

References

Acentropinae
Moths described in 1981